The Castle of King Edward is a 13th-century ruined castle near King Edward, Aberdeenshire, Scotland, located  north of Turriff, where the A947 crosses the Burn of King Edward, and  east of the River Deveron. The castle was the caput of the feudal barony of King Edward.

History

The castle dates from the 13th and 14th centuries, when it was occupied by the Comyn, Earls of Buchan, before it was likely slighted in 1308 by Robert the Bruce in the Harrying of Buchan during the First War of Scottish Independence. The property passed to Clan Ross, to Alexander Stewart, Earl of Buchan the Wolf of Badenoch, and to the MacDonald Earls of Ross.

It was forfeited in 1455, and subsequently the Forbes family acquired it in 1509. Written evidence from 1509 suggests that the castle was rebuilt in the 16th century by Lord Forbes, although little physical evidence of this has been found.

Structure

The castle was built on a knoll on the north side of the Burn of King Edward. There are two bridges at the site currently, which suggests that this may have been a strategic site when the castle was built. The castle was laid out as a courtyard running from north-west to south-east, surrounded on all four sides by walls and buildings. The great hall was on the north-east side of the courtyard, and the gatehouse was on the north-west curtain. A drawbridge was used to cross a ditch to enter the castle.

The castle now is largely ruined, with the remains of some structures still standing.

Notes

References 

Ruined castles in Aberdeenshire
Buildings and structures completed in the 13th century
Buildings and structures demolished in the 14th century
Clan Comyn